Justin (fl.  century) was a Latin writer and historian who lived under the  Roman Empire.

Life
Almost nothing is known of Justin's personal history, his name appearing only in the title of his work. He must have lived after Gnaeus Pompeius Trogus, whose work he excerpted, and his references to the Romans and Parthians' having divided the world between themselves would have been anachronistic after the rise of the Sassanians in the third century. His Latin appears to be consistent with the style of the second century. Ronald Syme, however, argues for a date around AD 390, immediately before the compilation of the Augustan History, and dismisses anachronisms and the archaic style as unimportant, as he asserts readers would have understood Justin's phrasing to represent Trogus' time, and not his own.

Works
Justin was the author of an epitome of Trogus' expansive Liber Historiarum Philippicarum, or Philippic Histories, a history of the kings of Macedonia, compiled in the time of Augustus.  Due to its numerous digressions, this work was retitled by one of its editors, Historia Philippicae et Totius Mundi Origines et Terrae Situs, or Philippic History and Origins of the Entire World and All of its Lands.  Justin's preface explains that he aimed to collect the most important and interesting passages of that work, which has since been lost.  Some of Trogus' original arguments are preserved in various other authors, such as Pliny the Elder.  Trogus' main theme was the rise and history of the Macedonian Empire, and like him, Justin permitted himself considerable freedom of digression, producing an idiosyncratic anthology rather than a strict epitome.

Legacy
Justin's history was much used in the Middle Ages, when its author was sometimes mistakenly conflated with Justin Martyr.

Notes

References

Bibliography
 
 .
 .

External links
 An early edition (Milan, 1476) of the Epitome from the Bavarian State Library
 Justin's Epitome at The Latin Library, Corpus Scriptorum Latinorum, & Itinera Electronica 
 Watson's 1853 translation at CSL, the Tertullian Project, & Attalus 
 Arnaud-Lindet's 2003 translation at CSL 
 Correa's 2003 partial translation at CSL 
 Prologi of Pompeius Trogus's work at the Tertullian Project

2nd-century Romans
2nd-century historians
2nd-century Latin writers
Latin historians
Year of death unknown
Year of birth unknown
Place of birth unknown